The 2002 CFL season is considered to be the 49th season in modern-day Canadian football, although it is officially the 45th Canadian Football League season.

CFL news in 2002
On March 19, Michael Lysko was relieved of his duties as CFL Commissioner by the board of governors. The board of governors then made chairman of the board, David Braley, acting CFL Commissioner, until November 23 when Tom E. Wright was introduced as the 11th CFL Commissioner in history.

On April 29, Paul Tagliabue became the first NFL Commissioner in history to visit the head offices of the CFL.

The Ottawa Renegades played their first regular-season game on June 28 at Frank Clair Stadium. The Ottawa Renegades were placed in the East Division and the Winnipeg Blue Bombers were returned to the West Division.

The CFL and CFLPA agreed to a new CBA agreement on October 16. TSN reported a 27% increase in viewership of over 50 CFL games. Plus, the CBC announced a record TV audience of more than 5.2 million Canadian viewers for the Grey Cup game between the Montreal Alouettes and the Edmonton Eskimos.

On November 20, four days before the 2002 Grey Cup game, the CFL unveiled a new logo: a red football (with white laces and circles at both ends) located in front of a maple leaf, also red, with black CFL lettering located beneath. It replaced the "helmet" logo that had been in use since 1969. This logo was used until 2015.

For the second consecutive year, the Grey Cup attendance was over 60,000.

Regular-season standings

Final regular-season standings
Note: GP = Games Played, W = Wins, L = Losses, T = Ties, OTL = Overtime losses, PF = Points For, PA = Points Against, Pts = Points

Bold text means that they have clinched the playoffs.
Edmonton and Montreal both have first round byes.
Due to the cross-over rule, the Saskatchewan Roughriders play the Toronto Argonauts in the Eastern Semi-Final Game.

Grey Cup playoffs

The Montreal Alouettes are the 2002 Grey Cup Champions, defeating the Edmonton Eskimos in front of their home crowd 25–16 at Edmonton's Commonwealth Stadium. This is the first championship for Montreal since 1977. The Alouettes' Anthony Calvillo (QB) was named the Grey Cup's Most Valuable Player and Pat Woodcock (WR) was the Grey Cup's Most Valuable Canadian.

Playoff bracket

CFL leaders
 CFL Passing Leaders
 CFL Rushing Leaders
 CFL Receiving Leaders

2002 CFL All-Stars

Offence
QB – Anthony Calvillo, Montreal Alouettes
RB – John Avery, Edmonton Eskimos
RB – Charles Roberts, Winnipeg Blue Bombers
SB – Terry Vaughn, Edmonton Eskimos
SB – Milt Stegall, Winnipeg Blue Bombers
WR – Derick Armstrong, Saskatchewan Roughriders
WR – Jason Tucker, Edmonton Eskimos
C – Bryan Chiu, Montreal Alouettes
OG – Scott Flory, Montreal Alouettes
OG – Jay McNeil, Calgary Stampeders
OT – Uzooma Okeke, Montreal Alouettes
OT – Dave Mudge, Winnipeg Blue Bombers

Defence
DT – Doug Brown, Winnipeg Blue Bombers
DT – Denny Fortney, Winnipeg Blue Bombers
DE – Joe Montford, Toronto Argonauts
DE – Elfrid Payton, Edmonton Eskimos
LB – John Grace, Ottawa Renegades
LB – Brendan Ayanbadejo, BC Lions
LB – Barrin Simpson, BC Lions
CB – Eric Carter, BC Lions
CB – Omarr Morgan, Saskatchewan Roughriders
DB – Barron Miles, Montreal Alouettes
DB – Clifford Ivory, Toronto Argonauts
DS – Orlondo Steinauer, Toronto Argonauts

Special teams
P – Noel Prefontaine, Toronto Argonauts
K – Sean Fleming, Edmonton Eskimos
ST – Corey Holmes, Saskatchewan Roughriders

2002 Western All-Stars

Offence
QB – Khari Jones, Winnipeg Blue Bombers
RB – John Avery, Edmonton Eskimos
RB – Charles Roberts, Winnipeg Blue Bombers
SB – Terry Vaughn, Edmonton Eskimos
SB – Milt Stegall, Winnipeg Blue Bombers
WR – Derick Armstrong, Saskatchewan Roughriders
WR – Jason Tucker, Edmonton Eskimos
C – Jamie Taras, BC Lions
OG – Steve Hardin, BC Lions
OG – Jay McNeil, Calgary Stampeders
OT – Bruce Beaton, Edmonton Eskimos
OT – Dave Mudge, Winnipeg Blue Bombers

Defence
DT – Doug Brown, Winnipeg Blue Bombers
DT – Denny Fortney, Winnipeg Blue Bombers
DE – Herman Smith, BC Lions
DE – Elfrid Payton, Edmonton Eskimos
LB – Carl Kidd, BC Lions
LB – Brendan Ayanbadejo, BC Lions
LB – Barrin Simpson, BC Lions
CB – Eric Carter, BC Lions
CB – Omarr Morgan, Saskatchewan Roughriders
DB – Harold Nash, Winnipeg Blue Bombers
DB – Bo Lewis, BC Lions
DS – Tom Europe, Winnipeg Blue Bombers

Special teams
P – Duncan O'Mahony, Calgary Stampeders
K – Sean Fleming, Edmonton Eskimos
ST – Corey Holmes, Saskatchewan Roughriders

2002 Eastern All-Stars

Offence
QB – Anthony Calvillo, Montreal Alouettes
RB – Troy Davis Hamilton Tiger-Cats
RB – Lawrence Phillips, Montreal Alouettes
SB – Ben Cahoon, Montreal Alouettes
SB – Derrell Mitchell, Toronto Argonauts
WR – Pat Woodcock, Montreal Alouettes
WR – Jimmy Oliver, Ottawa Renegades
C – Bryan Chiu, Montreal Alouettes
OG – Scott Flory, Montreal Alouettes
OG – Sandy Annunziata, Toronto Argonauts
OT – Uzooma Okeke, Montreal Alouettes
OT – Dave Hack, Hamilton Tiger-Cats

Defence
DT – Rob Brown, Montreal Alouettes
DT – Johnny Scott, Toronto Argonauts
DE – Joe Montford, Toronto Argonauts
DE – Marc Megna, Montreal Alouettes
LB – John Grace, Ottawa Renegades
LB – Stefen Reid, Montreal Alouettes
LB – Kevin Johnson, Montreal Alouettes
CB – Adrion Smith, Toronto Argonauts
CB – Wayne Shaw, Montreal Alouettes
DB – Barron Miles, Montreal Alouettes
DB – Clifford Ivory, Toronto Argonauts
DS – Rob Hitchcock, Hamilton Tiger-Cats

Special teams
P – Noel Prefontaine, Toronto Argonauts
K – Noel Prefontaine, Toronto Argonauts
ST – Keith Stokes, Montreal Alouettes

2002 CFLPA All-Stars

Offence
QB – Anthony Calvillo, Montreal Alouettes
OT – Uzooma Okeke, Montreal Alouettes
OT – Dave Mudge, Winnipeg Blue Bombers
OG – Andrew Greene, Saskatchewan Roughriders
OG – Steve Hardin, BC Lions
C – Bryan Chiu, Montreal Alouettes
RB – John Avery, Edmonton Eskimos
FB – Mike Sellers, Winnipeg Blue Bombers
SB – Milt Stegall, Winnipeg Blue Bombers
SB – Terry Vaughn, Edmonton Eskimos
WR – Arland Bruce, Winnipeg Blue Bombers
WR – Ben Cahoon, Montreal Alouettes

Defence
DE – Herman Smith, BC Lions
DE – Elfrid Payton, Edmonton Eskimos
DT – Robert Brown, Montreal Alouettes
DT – Johnny Scott, Toronto Argonauts
LB – Barrin Simpson, BC Lions
LB – Alondra Johnson, Calgary Stampeders
LB – Kevin Johnson, Montreal Alouettes
CB – Omarr Morgan, Saskatchewan Roughriders
CB – Marvin Coleman, Winnipeg Blue Bombers
HB – Gerald Vaughn, Ottawa Renegades
HB – Barron Miles, Montreal Alouettes
S – Rob Hitchcock, Hamilton Tiger-Cats

Special teams
K – Sean Fleming, Edmonton Eskimos
P – Noel Prefontaine, Toronto Argonauts
ST – Keith Stokes, Montreal Alouettes

Head coach
 Don Matthews, Montreal Alouettes

2002 CFLPA Western All-Stars

Offence
QB – Khari Jones,  Winnipeg Blue Bombers
OT – Dave Mudge, Winnipeg Blue Bombers
OT – Bruce Beaton, Edmonton Eskimos
OG – Andrew Greene Saskatchewan Roughriders
OG – Steve Hardin, BC Lions
C – Jamie Taras, BC Lions
RB – John Avery, Edmonton Eskimos
FB – Mike Sellers, Winnipeg Blue Bombers
SB – Terry Vaughn, Edmonton Eskimos
SB – Milt Stegall, Winnipeg Blue Bombers
WR – Arland Bruce, Winnipeg Blue Bombers
WR – Ed Hervey, Edmonton Eskimos

Defence
DE – Herman Smith, BC Lions
DE – Elfrid Payton, Edmonton Eskimos
DT – Doug Brown, Winnipeg Blue Bombers
DT – Nate Davis, Saskatchewan Roughriders
LB – Barrin Simpson, BC Lions
LB – Alondra Johnson, Calgary Stampeders
LB – Terry Ray, Edmonton Eskimos
CB – Omarr Morgan, Saskatchewan Roughriders
CB – Marvin Coleman, Winnipeg Blue Bombers
HB – Derrick Lewis, BC Lions
HB – Eric Carter, BC Lions
S – Greg Frers, Calgary Stampeders

Special teams
K – Sean Fleming, Edmonton Eskimos
P – Sean Fleming, Edmonton Eskimos
ST – Brendan Ayanbadejo, BC Lions

Head coach
 Danny Barrett, Saskatchewan Roughriders

2002 CFLPA Eastern All-Stars

Offence
QB – Anthony Calvillo, Montreal Alouettes
OT – Uzooma Okeke, Montreal Alouettes
OT – Neal Fort, Montreal Alouettes
OT – Val St. Germain, Ottawa Renegades
OG – Scott Flory, Montreal Alouettes
C – Bryan Chiu, Montreal Alouettes
RB – Lawrence Phillips, Montreal Alouettes
FB – Bruno Heppell, Montreal Alouettes
SB – Derrell Mitchell, Toronto Argonauts
SB – Archie Amerson, Hamilton Tiger-Cats
WR – Ben Cahoon, Montreal Alouettes
WR – Tony Miles Hamilton Tiger-Cats

Defence
DE – Joe Montford, Hamilton Tiger-Cats
DE – Michael Boireau, Ottawa Renegades
DT – Robert Brown, Montreal Alouettes
DT – Johnny Scott, Toronto Argonauts
LB – Kevin Johnson, Montreal Alouettes
LB – John Grace, Ottawa Renegades
LB – Chris Shelling, Hamilton Tiger-Cats
CB – Perry Carter, Montreal Alouettes
CB – Ricky Bell, Ottawa Renegades
HB – Gerald Vaughn, Ottawa Renegades
HB – Barron Miles, Montreal Alouettes
S – Rob Hitchcock, Hamilton Tiger-Cats

Special teams
K – Noel Prefontaine, Toronto Argonauts
P – Noel Prefontaine, Toronto Argonauts
ST – Keith Stokes, Montreal Alouettes

Head coach
 Don Matthews, Montreal Alouettes

2002 CFL Awards
CFL's Most Outstanding Player Award – Milt Stegall (SB), Winnipeg Blue Bombers
CFL's Most Outstanding Canadian Award – Ben Cahoon (WR), Montreal Alouettes
CFL's Most Outstanding Defensive Player Award – Elfrid Payton (DE), Edmonton Eskimos
CFL's Most Outstanding Offensive Lineman Award – Bryan Chiu (C), Montreal Alouettes
CFL's Most Outstanding Rookie Award – Jason Clermont (SB), BC Lions
CFL's Most Outstanding Special Teams Award – Corey Holmes (RB), Saskatchewan Roughriders
CFLPA's Outstanding Community Service Award – Greg Frers (DS), Calgary Stampeders
CFL's Coach of the Year – Don Matthews, Montreal Alouettes
Commissioner's Award - Hugh Campbell, Edmonton

References

2002 in Canadian football
2002